Markee may refer to:

Markee Ledge (born 1974), Scottish musician
Markee White (born 1983), American football player

See also
Markie (disambiguation)
Markie (disambiguation)
Marky (disambiguation), various people
Markees Stradivarius, a violin
Marquee (disambiguation)